Amsonia hubrichtii, commonly known as Hubricht's bluestar, Arkansas bluestar, or thread-leaf bluestar, is a North American species of perennial flowering plant in the Apocynaceae (dogbane) family, first described in 1943. It is native to Oklahoma and Arkansas in the south-central United States. It is commonly used as an ornamental plant.

Description
Leaves are very narrow, numerous, and alternate, giving the plant a feathery appearance. In the spring the leaves are bright green, and they turn gold in the fall. The flowers have 5 petals and fade to white with warmer temperatures.

Distribution and habitat
The plant is known from a limited number of populations in Oklahoma and Arkansas, primarily within the Ouachita Mountains Natural Division. In Oklahoma, it is considered an endangered species. It grows well in poor soils and full to partial sun.

Gallery

References

External links
photo of herbarium specimen at Missouri Botanical Garden, collected in Missouri in 1940
 

hubrichtii
Flora of Arkansas
Flora of Oklahoma
Plants described in 1943